Dunning railway station served the village of Dunning, Perth and Kinross, Scotland from 1848 to 1956 on the Scottish Central Railway.

History 
The station was opened on 22 May 1848 by the Scottish Central Railway. The station closed to both passengers and goods traffic on 11 June 1956.

References

External links 

Disused railway stations in Perth and Kinross
Former Caledonian Railway stations
Railway stations in Great Britain opened in 1848
Railway stations in Great Britain closed in 1956
1848 establishments in Scotland
1956 disestablishments in Scotland